Peter Lenderink (born 11 February 1996) is a Dutch former road cyclist. As a junior he won the bronze medal at the 2014 UCI Road World Championships in the Men's junior road race.

He retired from the sport in July 2018, after competing professionally for four years.

Major results
2014
 1st Overall Driedaagse van Axel
 3rd  Road race, UCI Junior Road World Championships
2016
 6th Overall Paris–Arras Tour

References

External links

1996 births
Living people
Dutch male cyclists
Dutch male speed skaters
People from Hardenberg
Cyclists from Overijssel
UCI Road World Championships cyclists for the Netherlands
Speed skaters at the 2012 Winter Youth Olympics
20th-century Dutch people
21st-century Dutch people